Scopula wittei is a moth of the  family Geometridae. It is found in the Democratic Republic of Congo.

References

Moths described in 1938
wittei
Moths of Africa